Rose Datoc Dall (born 1968) is a Filipina-American painter and is known for her contemporary figurative paintings and her religious works. 

Dall was born in Washington, D.C. and is a member of the Church of Jesus Christ of Latter-day Saints (LDS Church), joining at age 19. She received a BFA in Art History and Fine Art Studio from Virginia Commonwealth University School of the Arts in 1990. She was the subject of the LDS Church's "I'm a Mormon" ad campaign including a YouTube profile that garnered more than 150,000 views.

Career
Dall held a number of positions in her early career including as Gallery Director for the Alliance for the Varied Arts in Logan, Utah. As her career grew she began to garner commissions, gallery representation, and museum exhibitions. She is known for her religious art that includes depictions of Jesus Christ and early LDS Church historical figures such as Joseph Smith. She is also known for her unique contemporary style and use of bold colors.

Dall is a three-time Purchase Award Winner of the International Art Competition for the LDS Church's Church History Museum (2009, 2015, 2019). Some of her works are part of the  permanent collection at the Church History Museum in Salt Lake City, Utah and Southern Virginia University. In 2021, Dall was highlighted by Independent Catholic News on the topic of fasting for her work Fasting in the Wilderness.

Personal life
She married Timothy Dall in the Washington D.C. Temple in 1989 and they have four children. Dall lives in Lehi, Utah.

References

External links
 Rose Datoc Dall Official Website

Living people
1970 births
20th-century American painters
21st-century American painters
20th-century American women artists
21st-century American women artists
American artists of Filipino descent
American women painters
Latter Day Saints from Washington, D.C.
Painters from Washington, D.C.
Virginia Commonwealth University alumni